Close Quarters may refer to:

Close Quarters (Gilbert), a novel by Michael Gilbert
Close Quarters (Golding), a novel by William Golding
Close Quarters, a novel by Kenneth Bulmer, writing as Adam Hardy
Close Quarters, a novel by Jeff Gulvin
Close Quarters, a novel by Larry Heinemann
"Close Quarters" (The Professionals), an episode of the crime action television drama series

See also
 Close-quarters combat
 At Close Quarters, a 2007 novel